Isabel Quintero is an American writer of young adult literature, poetry and fiction.

Early life
Quintero was born in the Inland Empire of Southern California and pgrew up in the city of Corona. An elderly couple, Victor and Lucia Mejia, helped raise Isabel and her younger brother, and they became their grandparents. Quintero attended California State University in San Bernardino where she earned a Bachelor of Arts in English, and later a Master of Arts in English Composition.

Career
Quintero taught English at San Bernardino Valley College and Mt. San Jacinto College. She is a freelance writer for the Arts Council of San Bernardino and an active member of PoetrIE, an organization working to bring literary arts to Inland Empire communities. 

Quintero is the author of the young adult fiction novel Gabi, A Girl in Pieces (2014) and two books for younger children, Ugly Cat and Pablo (2017) and Ugly Cat and Pablo and the Missing Brother (2017). She has also written a graphic novel, Photographic: The Life of Graciela Iturbide.

Works

Books 

 Gabi, a Girl in Pieces. El Paso, TX: Cinco Puntos Press, 2014.
 Ugly Cat & Pablo. Illustrated by Tom Knight. New York, NY: Scholastic, 2017.
 Ugly Cat & Pablo and the Missing Brother. Illustrated by Tom Knight. New York, NY: Scholastic, 2018.
 Photographic: The Life of Graciela Iturbide. Illustrated by Zeke Peña. New York, NY: Getty Publications (Distribution by Abrams), 2018.
 My Papi Has a Motorcycle. Illustrated by Zeke Peña. New York, NY: Kokila, 2019.

Awards
Gabi, a Girl in Pieces has received multiple recognitions:
 Winner of the William C. Morris Award for YA Debut Novel
 Gold Medal Winner of the California Book Award for Young Adult 2015
 School Library Journal Best Books of 2014
 Booklist Best Books of 2014
 Amelia Bloomer List, part of the American Library Association, Social Responsibilities Round Table's Feminist Task Force
 2015 YALSA Quick Pick for Reluctant Young Adult Readers, Top 10 Selection
 2015 YALSA Best Fiction for Young Adults
 2015 Tomás Rivera Award, Works for Older Children
 2015 Paterson Prize for Books for Young People, Grades 7-12
 2015 Capitol Choices: Noteworthy Books for Children and Teens
Photographic: The Life of Graciela Iturbide won the 2018 Boston Globe–Horn Book Nonfiction Award

References

External links

Year of birth missing (living people)
Living people
21st-century American novelists
21st-century American poets
21st-century American women writers
American writers of Mexican descent
American writers of young adult literature
California State University, San Bernardino alumni
Novelists from California
People from Corona, California
People from San Bernardino, California
Poets from California
Women writers of young adult literature